Décio Cattaruzzi (born 13 November 1948) is a Brazilian former volleyball player. He competed in the men's tournament at the 1972 Summer Olympics.

References

External links
 

1948 births
Living people
Brazilian men's volleyball players
Olympic volleyball players of Brazil
Volleyball players at the 1972 Summer Olympics
People from Santo André, São Paulo
Sportspeople from São Paulo (state)
Pan American Games medalists in volleyball
Pan American Games bronze medalists for Brazil
Medalists at the 1971 Pan American Games